is a 1982 Japanese film directed by Yoshitaro Nomura.

Cast

Awards and nominations
7th Hochi Film Award 
 Won: Best Actress - Kaori Momoi

Other adaptations
 Giwaku (November 13, 1992) on FUJI TV, starring Ayumi Ishida.
 Giwaku (March 22, 2003) on TV Asahi, starring Kōichi Satō.
 Giwaku (January 24, 2009) on TV Asahi, starring Masakazu Tamura.
Kokuhatsu Kokusen Bengonin (2011) (8 episodes) on TV Asahi, starring Masakazu Tamura.
 Giwaku (November 9, 2012) on FUJI TV, starring Takako Tokiwa.
 Giwaku (February 3, 2019) on TV Asahi, starring Ryōko Yonekura.

References

1982 films
Films directed by Yoshitaro Nomura
1980s Japanese-language films
Films scored by Yasushi Akutagawa
1980s Japanese films